This is the List of municipalities in Kastamonu Province, Turkey .

References 

Geography of Kastamonu Province
Kastamonu